Reader is an English surname. Notable people with the surname include the following:

 D. J. Reader (born 1984) American football defensive tackle for the Cincinnati Bengals of the National Football League 
 Brian Reader (born 1989), Arena football quarterbyiack
 Colin Reader (born ?), English geologist
 Dickie Reader (1890–1974), English footballer
 Eddi Reader (born 1959), Scottish singer
 Felix Reader (1850–1911), German-born Australian chemist and amateur botanist
 Francis Reader (born 1965), Scottish musician, band-member of "The Trash Can Sinatras"
 Ralph Reader (1903–1982), British director and producer
 Richard Reader Harris (KC) (1847–1909), English barrister and Pentecostalist
 Richard Reader Harris (politician) (1913–2009), MP, English politician
 Ted Reader, Canadian chef

See also
 Reader (disambiguation)
 Reeder (surname)

English-language surnames